Inverness is an unincorporated community in Bullock County in the U.S. state of Alabama.

According to the United States Geological Survey, variant names are Thomas Station and Thomasville.

Notable people
Billy Hitchcock, born in Inverness, major league baseball player, graduate of Auburn University
Jimmy Hitchcock, born in Inverness, major league baseball player, graduate of Auburn

References

External links
 

Unincorporated communities in Bullock County, Alabama
Unincorporated communities in Alabama